Hamline may refer to:
Hamline University in the United States
Leonidas Lent Hamline, the university's namesake